The Kashubian-Pomeranian Association (Kashubian-Pomeranian: Kaszëbskò-Pòmòrsczé Zrzeszenié, Polish: Zrzeszenie Kaszubsko-Pomorskie) is a regional non-governmental organization of Kashubians (Pomeranians), Kociewiacy and other people interested in the regional affairs of Kashubia and Pomerania in northern Poland. Its headquarters are in Gdańsk, Poland.

The Kashubian Language Council (Kashubian: Radzëzna Kaszëbsczégò Jãzëka; Polish: Rada Języka Kaszubskiego) is a body of the Kashubian-Pomeranian Association that oversees and promotes the Kashubian language.

"Pomerania" is a monthly journal founded in 1963 which publishes in Polish and Kashubian.

Presidents of the Association:
 1956–59: Aleksander Arendt
 1959–71: Bernard Szczęsny
 1971–76: Jerzy Kiedrowski
 1976–80: Stanisław Pestka
 1980–83: Izabella Trojanowska
 1983–86: Szczepan Lewna
 1986–92: Józef Borzyszkowski
 1992–94: Stanisław Pestka
 1994–98: Jan Wyrowiński
 1998–04: Brunon Synak
 2004–10: Artur Jabłoński
 2010–16: Łukasz Grzędzicki
 2016–19: Edmund Wittbrodt
 2019–present: Jan Wyrowiński

References

External links
ZK-P official site

Kashubians
Pomerania
Polish regional societies